Me! Me! Me! (stylized as ME! ME! ME!) is the first full-length album by Japanese-American recording artist Joe Inoue, originally released as a standard release and a limited edition release containing a DVD of music videos on April 8, 2009. Me! Me! Me! peaked at number 86 on the Oricon Weekly Album Charts, remaining on the charts for only one week. As with all of Inoue's music, he mixes, arranges, and performs on every track.

Track listing
All songs are written, composed, and performed by Joe Inoue.
 "Closer (Royal Ver.)" – 3:24
  – 2:32
 "Maboroshi (Illusion)" – 4:39
 "Party Night (Odoritari Night)" – 2:48
 "Into Oblivion" – 3:06
 "One Man Band (Symphonicated Ver.)" – 3:35
  – 3:11
 "Hannah" – 3:26
 "Gravity (Sunset Ver.)" – 3:06
  – 2:51
 "Afterglow" – 2:40
  – 3:09
 "Hello! (Album Mix)" – 3:45
 "Walking After You" (Acoustic)"

Limited edition DVD
"Nowhere" (Music Video)
"Hummingbird" (Music Video)
"Hello!" (Music Video)
"Closer" (Music Video)
"Maboroshi" (Music Video)
Inoue Joe Artist Documentary
Joe TV with Music Videos

References

External links
 Joe Inoue's official website 

2009 albums
Joe Inoue albums